Luis de la Torre was one of the Spanish conquistadors who governed New Spain while Hernán Cortés was absent from the capital.

History
There was much infighting during this period (1524-28). Nine men were involved in the government, not including Cortés himself, who made a very brief return in 1526. They usually formed a governing council of three, never more than  five, and occasionally only one or two. This interval began with Cortés's expedition to Honduras and ended with the arrival of the first Audiencia Real.

Not much is known about la Torre. He was in the government of the Viceroyalty of New Spain from March 2, 1527 to December 8, 1528, or about 1 year and 9 months. 

Alonso de Estrada was also in the government for this period, and for the early part (until August 22, 1527), so was Gonzalo de Sandoval. La Torre and Estrada were cousins.

On the latter date, a royal decree was received in Mexico City, ratifying the transfer of powers granted by Luis Ponce de León to Marcos de Aguilar, but Aguilar had died on March 1. Before he died, Aguilar had named Estrada governor, and this decree from Spain solidified Estrada's position. Since Cortés was suspected of poisoning both Luis Ponce de León and Aguilar, he was not in a position to challenge Alonso de Estrada and Luis de la Torre.

A person named Luis de la Torre accompanied Christopher Columbus to the New World on one of his voyages, and is credited with being the co-discoverer (among Europeans) of tobacco. However, that may have been the uncle of this man.

See also
 

Spanish conquistadors
People of New Spain
Spanish colonial governors and administrators
Year of birth unknown
Year of death unknown
1520s in Mexico
1527 in New Spain
1528 in New Spain
Colonial Mexico
16th-century Mexican people
16th-century Spanish people